Duke Dao of Qin (died 477 BC) was from 491 to 477 BC the 21st ruler of the Zhou Dynasty Chinese state of Qin that eventually united China to become the Qin Dynasty.  His ancestral name was Ying (嬴), and Duke Dao was his posthumous title.

Duke Dao succeeded his father Duke Hui I of Qin, who died in 492 BC, as ruler of Qin.  Duke Dao reigned for 15 years and died in 477 BC.  He was succeeded by his son Duke Ligong of Qin.

References

Year of birth unknown
Rulers of Qin
5th-century BC Chinese monarchs
477 BC deaths